Van Buren Street station  is a commuter rail  station in downtown Chicago that serves the Metra Electric Line to University Park, Blue Island, and South Chicago neighborhood; and the South Shore Line to Gary and South Bend, Indiana.

The station has three tracks, with one side and one island platform. During the morning rush hour, platform 1 serves all outbound trains. Platform 2 serves local trains arriving from South Chicago, and trains from Blue Island. Platform 3 serves trains from the University Park mainline, which are usually expresses. During the off-peak hours and evening rush hour, Platform 1 serves express trains serving the University Park mainline. Platform 2 serves local trains headed for South Chicago, and trains headed for Blue Island. Platform 3 serves all inbound trains. In addition, South Shore Line trains from Millennium Station use platform 1, while trains to Millennium Station use platform 3, regardless of the time of day.

One of the station's entrances is a replica of an Hector Guimard-designed, Art Nouveau-style Paris Métro entrance. The entrance was given to Chicago as a gift by the city of Paris in 2001.

Bus connections
CTA Buses
 1 Bronzeville/Union Station
 3 King Drive
 4 Cottage Grove (Owl Service)
 X4 Cottage Grove Express
 6 Jackson Park Express
 7 Harrison
 J14 Jeffery Jump
 26 South Shore Express
 126 Jackson
 130 Museum Campus (Summer Service Only)
 147 Outer DuSable Lake Shore Express
 148 Clarendon/Michigan Express
 151 Sheridan

Gallery

References

External links
 

 South Shore Line - Stations
Jackson Drive entrance from Google Maps Street View
Van Buren Street entrance from Google Maps Street View
Article from Railway Review (1897) with original floor plan

Former Illinois Central Railroad stations
Metra stations in Chicago
South Shore Line stations in Illinois
Art Nouveau architecture in Chicago
Art Nouveau railway stations
Railway stations in the United States opened in 1896